2005 French Syndicate of Cinema Critics Awards
February 14, 2005

Best Picture:
 Rois et reine
The 2005 French Syndicate of Cinema Critics Awards, given on February 14, 2005, honored the best in film for 2004.

Winners
Best Film: Rois et reine
Best Short: Sous mon lit
Best Foreign Film: Lost in Translation
Best First Film: A Common Thread

External links 
2005 French Syndicate of Cinema Critics Awards IMDB

2005 film awards
Syndicate of Cinema Critics Awards
Syndicate of Cinema Critics Awards
French Union of Film Critics Awards